Jordan Branch is a  long 2nd order tributary to Sewell Branch in Kent County, Delaware.

Course
Jordan Branch rises on the Island Pond Marsh Ditch divide about 0.1 miles east of Fords Corner, Delaware.

Watershed
Jordan Branch drains  of area, receives about 44.7 in/year of precipitation, has a topographic wetness index of 727.94 and is about 6.6% forested.

See also
List of rivers of Delaware

Maps

References 

Rivers of Delaware
Rivers of Kent County, Delaware